Derek Allen Ryan (born December 29, 1986) is an American professional ice hockey forward for the Edmonton Oilers of the National Hockey League (NHL).

An undrafted player, Ryan played four successful seasons of Canadian university hockey and pursued a professional career in Europe before making his NHL debut at age 29. After being named the MVP of the Swedish Hockey League in 2015, Ryan signed his first NHL contract with the Carolina Hurricanes in June of that year. He played parts of three seasons with the Hurricanes before signing with the Flames in July 2018.

Playing career
Ryan started his junior career with his hometown's Spokane Braves of the Kootenay International Junior Hockey League (KIJHL) from 2002 to 2004.

Ryan played four seasons of major junior hockey (2003–2007) in the Western Hockey League (WHL), again representing his hometown club, the Spokane Chiefs.<ref></</ref> With limited NHL interest due to his diminutive size, he went on to play four seasons of Canadian university hockey (2007–2011) with the University of Alberta Golden Bears in the CWUAA conference of Canadian Interuniversity Sport (CIS). For his outstanding college hockey, play he was named the CIS (West) Most Valuable Player for the 2010–11 season, and was also named to the 2010–11 CIS All-Canadian First Team.

Ryan embarked on a professional career in Europe and made his debut in the 2011–12 season in the Austrian League (EBEL) with Hungarian club Alba Volán Székesfehérvár under head coach Kevin Primeau. After placing third in team scoring with 49 points in 50 games, Ryan was signed to an improved contract with Austrian club EC VSV on July 7, 2012. In his second season in Villach, Ryan lead the EBEL with 38 goals and finished with 84 points in 54 games. He was awarded the Ron Kennedy Trophy as the league's most valuable player for the 2013–14 season.

On April 10, 2014, Ryan moved to the Swedish Hockey League (SHL), signing a lucrative contract with Örebro HK. In the 2014–15 season, Ryan's rapid ascent in the professional leagues continued as he became the cornerstone of Örebro's offence and in leading the club to the playoffs, lead the SHL in scoring with 45 assists and 60 points to be selected as the league's Forward of the Year and the SHL Most Valuable player.

Carolina Hurricanes and Calgary Flames
Earning NHL interest after defying initial size concerns, Ryan signed a one-year, two-way contract with the Carolina Hurricanes on June 15, 2015. He was called up to the Hurricanes in February 2016 and made his NHL debut on March 1 against the New Jersey Devils, also scoring his first NHL goal in the game, against goaltender Cory Schneider. Ryan played two full seasons with the Hurricanes, establishing himself as a versatile forward able to play both centre and wing and who could be counted on to play on both the powerplay and the penalty-killing units. Ryan also established himself as a more than reliable faceoff man; finishing with a faceoff percentage of 55.3% in the 2016–17 season, and 56.48% in the 2017–18 season.

Ryan left Carolina as a free agent to reunite with former Hurricanes head coach Bill Peters in signing a three-year, $9.375 million contract with the Calgary Flames on July 1, 2018. After a slow start to 2018–19 which saw him record only two goals in the season's first 20 games, Ryan managed to find chemistry with wingers Garnet Hathaway and Andrew Mangiapane, with the trio emerging as one of the key reasons for Calgary's first-place finish in the Western Conference. Ryan also finished a close 2nd place League wide in faceoff percentage with a percent of 58.2%, only 0.04% less than Jason Spezza. In the playoffs, Ryan recorded one goal in five games as the Flames lost to the Colorado Avalanche in the first round.

Firmly established as the Flames' third-line centre, Ryan continued his strong play into the 2019–20 season – albeit with two new wingers. Hathaway signed with the Washington Capitals in July 2019, with his vacated spot on Ryan's wing being filled by trade acquisition Milan Lucic. Lucic endured a similar dry spell to begin his Flames tenure as Ryan had a year previously; however, the two soon found chemistry on the third line and the second powerplay unit. With Mangiapane moving up to the second line to supplant a declining Michael Frolík, who was eventually traded to the Buffalo Sabres in January 2020, Ryan and Lucic were joined by rookie Dillon Dubé. Ryan scored 10 goals and 29 points in 68 games before the season was halted prematurely due to the COVID-19 pandemic.

Edmonton Oilers
Following the completion of his contract with the Flames, Ryan left the club as a free agent, opting to remain in Alberta by agreeing to a two-year, $2.5 million contract with rival club, the Edmonton Oilers on July 28, 2021. On February 26, 2022, Ryan scored his first NHL hat-trick in a 4–3 victory over the Florida Panthers.

Personal life
Ryan was raised in Spokane by his parents Nancy (who died during Ryan's second season with the Alberta Golden Bears) and Tim. He has one sister. He and his wife Bonnie have a son, born in 2013, and a daughter, born in 2016.

Ryan and his wife are members of the Church of Jesus Christ of Latter-day Saints.

Career statistics

Regular season and playoffs

International

Awards and honors

References

External links

1986 births
Living people
Alberta Golden Bears ice hockey players
American expatriate ice hockey players in Canada
American men's ice hockey centers
Calgary Flames players
Carolina Hurricanes players
Charlotte Checkers (2010–) players
EC VSV players
Edmonton Oilers players
Fehérvár AV19 players
Ice hockey people from Washington (state)
Kalamazoo Wings (UHL) players
Örebro HK players
Spokane Chiefs players
Undrafted National Hockey League players